G. Iyaappan (கோ. அய்யப்பன்) is an Indian politician and a member of Legislative Assembly of Tamil Nadu. A native of Cuddalore district, His profession according to the election affidavit filed with the Election Commission is: Real Estate, Farmer. G Iyappan's educational qualifications are: Post Graduate and is 63 years old now. He has been elected to the Tamil Nadu legislative assembly as a Dravida Munnetra Kazhagam candidate from Cuddalore constituency in 2006 and 2021. He has two sons, Dr. Praveen and Vinoth.

Electoral performance

References

Living people
Indian politicians
1950s births
People from Cuddalore district
Tamil Nadu MLAs 2021–2026
Dravida Munnetra Kazhagam politicians